Anastasiya Yuriyivna Vasylyeva (born 18 January 1992) is a Ukrainian former professional tennis player.
 

She won nine singles and 28 doubles titles on tournaments of the ITF Circuit.
Her highest WTA rankings are 129 in singles, achieved August 2014, and No. 145 in doubles, which she reached in October 2015.

Vasylyeva played only one match for the Ukraine Fed Cup team, partnering Olga Savchuk. In February 2016, they defeated Swedish pair of Cornelia Lister and Jacqueline Cabaj Awad, in straight sets.

ITF Circuit finals

Singles: 24 (9 titles, 15 runner-ups)

Doubles: 53 (28 titles, 25 runner-ups)

External links

 
 
 

1992 births
Living people
Ukrainian female tennis players
Sportspeople from Kharkiv
21st-century Ukrainian women